Laurence Ruel (born 6 November 1957), known by her pen name Camille Laurens, is a French writer and winner of the 2000 Prix Femina for Dans ces bras-là. Laurens is a member of the Académie Goncourt.

Career 
A graduate of humanities, Camille Laurens taught in Rouen in Normandy. In 1984, she began teaching in Morocco, where she spent twelve years. Since September 2011, she has taught at the Institut d'études politiques de Paris (Sciences Po).

Between 2007 and 2019, she was a member of the jury for the Prix Femina. She had been a member of the Académie Goncourt since 11 February 2020.

Fiction and Autofiction 

Although meant to be read separately, the alphabetical titling of the chapters of four of Camille Laurens’ first novels—Index (1991), Romance (1992), Les Travaux d’Hercule (1994), and L’Avenir (1998)—suggest a tetralogy. They are characterized by a high degree of fantasy and what Philippe Savary has described as “an abiding reflection on the relationship between fiction and reality, illusion and truth.”

The death of a child in 1994 inspired first Philippe (1995) then, again, Cet absent-là (2004) and a deep transformation of her art away from fiction per se and toward autofiction. Thus, from the 1990s onward, she developed an ever more introspective work on the self and her relationship to others, to desire. Hence, texts like Dans ces bras-là (2000), Ni toi ni moi (2006) and Romance nerveuse (2010). The first of these is awarded both the Prix Femina and the Prix Renaudot des lycéens.

Essays and Other Publishing Activities 

In addition to fiction, Camille Laurens has authored several essays. Les Fiancées du Diable (2011) studies the representation of women in art and the extent to which the feminine is taboo in collective consciousness and, thus, in works of art. The act of repetition—whether in serial painting, the poetic rime, or else neurosis—is the subject of Encore et jamais (2013). In La Petite Danseuse de quatorze ans (2017), Laurens reconstructs the life of Marie van Goethem, who served as model for Edgar Degas.

Since 2002, Camille Laurens has regularly chronicled literary works in national newspapers: notably in “Écritures,” appearing monthly from 2015 to 2019 in Libération and, since 2019, a weekly serial in Le Monde des livres.

Controversy 
In September 2021, the Prix Goncourt attracted controversy after the jury decided, by a vote of 7 to 3, to include Les enfants de Cadillac by François Noudelmann on its 2021 list of finalists. Laurens, who is a member of the prize's jury, is the partner of Noudelmann. Laurens voted in favor of her partner's book. It also emerged that shortly after the shortlist was revealed Laurens had written a negative review in Le Monde of one of Noudelmann's competitors for the prize, La Carte postale by Anne Berest. France Inter, who first revealed the conflict of interest, described her review as containing "unheard-of brutality". Laurens defended herself, saying that she wrote the review before the Goncourt selected its finalists. She also claimed she was being attacked for being a woman and not on the substance of her arguments in the review. However, historian Jean-Yves Mollier said, "She straight-out assassinated one of the candidates." In October 2021, the Académie Goncourt ultimately decided that it will no longer allow lovers and family members of the jury to be entered for consideration.

Awards and honours 
 2000: Prix Femina for Dans ces bras-là
 2000: Prix Renaudot des lycéens for Dans ces bras-là
 2006: Finalist in the first selection for the Prix Goncourt for Ni toi ni moi
 2006:  Officier of the Ordre des Arts et des Lettres
 2008: Prix Bourgogne de littérature for Tissé par mille
 2016: Prix du Roman-News for Celle que vous croyez
 2018: Prix David de l'expertise for La Petite Danseuse de 14 ans
 2018: Prix Ève-Delacroix of the Académie Française for La Petite Danseuse de 14 ans
 2020: Best Book of the Year by the magazine Lire for Fille

Works 
 
 
 
 
 
 
 
 
 
 
 
 
 
 
 
 Little Dancer Aged Fourteen: The True Story Behind Degas's Masterpiece (English translation), Other Press, 2018

References

1957 births
Living people
Writers from Dijon
French women novelists
Prix Femina winners
Academic staff of Sciences Po
20th-century French non-fiction writers
21st-century French non-fiction writers
Officiers of the Ordre des Arts et des Lettres
20th-century French women writers
21st-century French women writers
Prix Renaudot des lycéens winners
Pseudonymous writers
Pseudonymous women writers
20th-century pseudonymous writers
21st-century pseudonymous writers